Halipegus is a genus of trematode in the family Derogenidae. 

The status of H. eccentricus has been disputed. In 1998, it was suggested that it be regarded as a junior synonym of H. occidualis, but this was rejected in 1999.

Species 
The following species are accepted within Halipegus:

 Halipegus africanus Dollfus, 1950
 Halipegus alhaussaini Saoud & Roshdy, 1970
 Halipegus ambalensis Gupta & Chopra, 1987
 Halipegus barabankiensis Choudhary, Ray & Agrawal, 2019
 Halipegus bulla (Fain, 1953) Skrjabin & Gushanskaja, 1955
 Halipegus ctenopomi Jones, 1982
 Halipegus dubius Klein, 1905
 Halipegus eccentricus Thomas, 1939
 Halipegus eschi Zelmer & Brooks, 2000
 Halipegus ghanensis Fischthal & Thomas, 1968
 Halipegus insularis Capron, Deblock & Brygoo, 1961
 Halipegus japonicus Yamaguti, 1936
 Halipegus kimberleyana (Porter, 1938) Skrjabin & Guschanskaya, 1955
 Halipegus mehransis Srivastava, 1933
 Halipegus occidualis Stafford, 1905
 Halipegus ovocaudatus (Vulpian, 1859) Looss, 1899
 Halipegus perplexus Simer, 1929
 Halipegus phrynobatrachi Maeder, 1969
 Halipegus psilonotae Leon-Regagnon & Romero-Mayén, 2013
 Halipegus rhodesiensis Beverley-Burton, 1963
 Halipegus spindale Srivastava, 1933
 Halipegus tafonensis Meskal, 1970
 Halipegus udaipurensis Gupta & Agrawal, 1967
 Halipegus zweifeli Moravec & Sey, 1989

References 

Plagiorchiida
Animals described in 1899